She's in Control is the debut studio album by Canadian electro-funk duo Chromeo, released on February 17, 2004 by Turbo Recordings and Vice Records.

Track listing

Personnel
Credits adapted from the liner notes of She's in Control.

 Chromeo – art direction, executive producer, instruments, mixing, production, vocals
 Coco – extra vocal bits 
 Tom Coyne – mastering
 Eskimo Design – art direction, artwork, cover photo
 Craig Hodgeson – saxophone, soloist 
 Kool DJ Alain M. – turntable scratches 
 Ozzie – extra vocal bits 
 Greg Smith – mixing, recording
 Tiga – executive producer

Release history

References

2004 debut albums
Chromeo albums
Modular Recordings albums
V2 Records albums
Vice Records albums